Frank Charles Hannibal Jr. (March 21, 1931July 23, 2011), better known as Marc Hannibal, was an actor, singer and sportsman, perhaps best known for his tenure with the Harlem Globetrotters from 1954 to 1956.

Basketball career
He studied at Benson Polytechnic High School in Portland, Oregon, where he was a star basketball player. After serving briefly in the U.S. Army, he was recruited in 1954 to the Harlem Globetrotters where he played for two years and toured with the team. In 1956 he played with the Harlem Magicians.

Acting career
Hannibal's TV acting debut was in 1963 on "CBS Repertoire Workshop", where he narrated the story of the historical Dred Scott Supreme Court case. He starred in several variety shows, including "Hannibal's Trunk". He had guest appearances in a number of television series including Dragnet 1967, Marcus Welby, M.D., Columbo, a number of Adam-12 episodes and in  Mission Impossible, McCloud, Kojak and others. He produced and starred in the Las Vegas variety show On the Strip. Hannibal also appeared in feature films such as Airport and starred as a gladiator superhero in the 1974 film Super Stooges vs. the Wonder Women.

Singing career
As a child, Hannibal was featured on the "Stars of Tomorrow" show in Portland. He sang throughout the 1960s and early 1970s in various Portland venues including the Jazz Quarry and the Prima Donna. He recorded two albums: the first, self-titled Marc Hannibal for Philips label, the second entitled Night Times for First American independent label. His music was chronicled in the Carolan Gladden book entitled The First Book of Oregon Jazz, Rock and All Sorts of Music.

In popular culture
In 2002, Marc Hannibal's song "Forever Is a Long, Long Time" taken from his debut album Marc Hannibal, was sampled by Royce da 5'9" for the latter's song "Boom" that appeared on the album Rock City
The song was also used on the soundtrack of MTV's 2001 television film Hip Hopera: Carmen.

Discography
Marc Hannibal (on Philips label)
Night Times (on First American label)

Filmography

References

Footnotes

Sources

External links

1931 births
2011 deaths
American men's basketball players
American male singers
Benson Polytechnic High School alumni
Harlem Globetrotters players
Male actors from Portland, Oregon
Sportspeople from Salem, Oregon